Savius jurgiosus is a species of leaf-footed bug in the family Coreidae. It is found in Central America and North America.

Subspecies
These two subspecies belong to the species Savius jurgiosus:
 Savius jurgiosus jurgiosus (Stål, 1862)
 Savius jurgiosus nigroclavatus Brailovsky, 1986

References

External links

 

Discogastrini
Articles created by Qbugbot
Insects described in 1862